Phragmataecia terebrifer is a species of moth of the family Cossidae. It was described by Thomas Bainbrigge Fletcher and is found in India.

References

Moths described in 1927
Phragmataecia